Hanna Oftedal Sagosen (born 4 July 1994) is a retired Norwegian handball player who most recently played for the Danish club Silkeborg-Voel KFUM.
She also represented Norway in the 2013 Women's Junior European Handball Championship, placing 4th, and in the 2014 Women's Junior World Handball Championship, placing 9th.

In November 2019 she announced her retirement, due to serious injury.

Personal life 
She is a younger sister of Stine Bredal Oftedal.

She is married to fellow handballer Sander Sagosen.

Achievements 
Youth European Championship:
Bronze Medalist: 2011
World Youth Championship:
Bronze Medalist: 2012

Individual awards
 All-Star Right Back of the U18 European Open: 2012
French Championship Hope of the Season: 2015

References

1994 births
Living people
People from Nittedal
Norwegian female handball players
Expatriate handball players
Norwegian expatriate sportspeople in France
Sportspeople from Viken (county)
21st-century Norwegian women